Let Go is the first album by Canadian singer-songwriter Avril Lavigne. It was released on June 4, 2002 by Arista Records. For a year after signing a record deal with Arista, Lavigne struggled due to conflicts in musical direction. She relocated to Los Angeles, where she recorded her earlier materials for the album, the sound of which the label did not approve. She was paired with the production team the Matrix, who understood her vision for the album. Critics described Let Go as an alternative rock album with a pop punk and post-grunge-oriented sound.

The album was credited as the biggest pop debut of 2002 and was certified 7x Platinum in the United States. It was released to generally positive reviews, although Lavigne's songwriting received some criticism. It also did extremely well in Canada, receiving a diamond certification from  Music Canada, as well as reaching multi-platinum in many countries around the world, including the UK, in which she became the youngest female solo artist to have a number-one album in the region.

Let Go has sold over 16 million copies worldwide, making it Lavigne's highest-selling album to date and the best selling album of the 21st century by a Canadian artist. According to Billboard, the album was the 21st best-selling album of the decade. A Rolling Stone readers' poll named Let Go the fourth best album of the 2000s. The album is considered one of the albums that transformed the pop punk music scene, helping to consolidate the genre in the mainstream and contributing to the rise of female-fronted pop punk bands and female-driven punk-influenced pop music. On 18 March 2013, Let Go was re-released as a double disc-set paired with her second studio album, Under My Skin, which is released under RCA Records. The album was further promoted by the Try to Shut Me Up Tour between December 2002 and June 2003.

Background
In November 2000, Ken Krongard, an A&R representative, invited Antonio "L.A." Reid, then head of Arista Records, to producer Peter Zizzo's Manhattan studio to hear Lavigne sing. Her 15-minute audition "so impressed" Reid that he immediately signed her to Arista with a deal worth $1.25 million for two albums and an extra $900,000 for a publishing advance. By this time, Lavigne had found that she fit in naturally with her hometown high school's skater clique, an image that carried through to her first album, but although she enjoyed skateboarding, school left her feeling insecure. Armed with a record deal, she dropped out to focus on her music career, but she still had to inform her parents of her decision. "I wasn't going to turn [the record deal] down. It's been my dream all my life. They knew how much I wanted this and how much I've put into it."

Lavigne relocated to Los Angeles, where she collaborated with songwriter and producer Clif Magness, who gave her ample creative control in the writing process. Lavigne and Magness wrote "Losing Grip" and "Unwanted", songs that she deemed reflective of her vision for the entire album. However, Arista was not thrilled with the heavy-guitar laden songs that Lavigne was writing, prompting the label to look for other producers to match their demands.

Now two years since she signed the deal, Lavigne, who was then unknown, came to the attention of the three-piece production team the Matrix. Arista could not find the right direction for Lavigne, so the team's manager, Sandy Roberton, suggested that they work together: "Why don't you put her together with the Matrix for a couple of days?" According to member Lauren Christy, they had been listening to Lavigne's early songs and felt they contained "a Faith Hill kind of vibe". As soon as they saw Lavigne coming into their studio, the Matrix felt that her musical direction was incongruous to her image and attitude. After talking to Lavigne for an hour, "we cottoned on that she wasn't happy but couldn't quite figure out where to go." The Matrix played her songs with Faith Hill influences, because these were the kinds of songs the label wanted Lavigne to sing. But Lavigne dismissed it, saying she wanted songs with punk rock inclinations. Lavigne played the Matrix a song that she had recorded and really loved, a track with sounds evocative of the rock band System of a Down. Fortunately, prior to forming the Matrix, its members' early projects were in the pop-rock vein, so they readily figured out what Lavigne wanted to record and knew exactly what to do with her. They told her to come back the following day. In the meantime, they wrote a song that evolved into "Complicated" and another song called "Falling Down" (which appears on the Sweet Home Alabama soundtrack). They played these for Lavigne when she returned the following day; the songs ultimately allowed her to visualize the path she should take.

When Josh Sarubin, the A&R executive who signed Lavigne to the imprint, heard "Complicated", he knew it was right for her. Lavigne presented the song to Reid, who approved of the musical direction Lavigne and the Matrix were taking, and set "Complicated" as the album's lead single. Reid sent Lavigne back to the Matrix to work with them, initially for a month. Arista gave the team carte blanche to write and produce ten songs, which took them two months. The album was originally titled Anything but Ordinary, after the track of the same name that the Matrix produced, but Lavigne asked Reid for the album to be called Let Go instead, which is the title of an unreleased demo featured on Lavigne's 2001 B-Sides.

The album cover was taken in Manhattan, New York City at the intersection of Broadway and Canal Street. In 2022, Lavigne visited the same place and recreated the cover in a short video for the 20th anniversary of the album.

Writing and recording
With the Matrix, Lavigne recorded tracks in Decoy Studios, situated in a Los Angeles suburb known as Valley Village. She also worked with producer-songwriter Curt Frasca and Peter Zizzo, whose Manhattan studio Lavigne was checked in prior to securing a record deal with Arista, and where Lavigne also recorded some of the tracks. The Matrix member Scott Spock was their principal engineer for the project, while Tom Lord-Alge was assigned to mix the tracks. Lavigne recorded complete takes "against the largely finished instrumental tracks". Spocks revealed Lavigne normally recorded each song in five or six takes, "and probably 90 percent of what was finally used came from the first or second takes." The Matrix also contributed backing vocals.

Introduced as a singer-songwriter, Lavigne's involvement produced significant issues. Lavigne has implied that she is the primary author of the album. In an article published in Rolling Stone magazine, Lavigne stated that while working with the Matrix, one member would be in the recording studio while they were writing, but did not write the guitar parts, lyrics, or the melody. According to Lavigne, she and Christy wrote all the lyrics together. Graham would come up with some guitar parts, "and I'd be like, 'Yeah, I like that,' or 'No, I don't like that.' None of those songs aren't from me."

The Matrix, who produced six songs for Lavigne, five of which appear in the album, had another explanation of how the collaboration went. According to them, they wrote much of the portions in the three singles: "Complicated", "Sk8er Boi", and "I'm with You", which were conceived using a guitar and piano. Christy said, "Avril would come in and sing a few melodies, change a word here or there." Reid complemented the issue over the credits: "If I'm looking for a single for an artist, I don't care who writes it. Avril had the freedom to do as she really pleased, and the songs show her point of view. ... Avril has always been confident about her ideas."

Although she needed pop songs "to break" into the industry, Lavigne felt "Complicated" does not reflect her and her songwriting skills. Nonetheless, she was grateful for the song because it successfully launched her career. She favors more "Losing Grip", because "it means so much more when it comes straight from the artist".

Release and promotion

The album was released on 4 June 2002, in Canada and the United States. Later, on 22 July, Let Go hit record stores worldwide, and on 26 August in some parts of Europe, including the United Kingdom and Ireland. A DataPlay version of the album was released in September 2002. Arista had established a deal with DataPlay earlier in 2002 and included Let Go alongside albums by rock singer Santana and singer Whitney Houston in the release.

Although Lavigne was targeted to the teen audience, a marketing strategy credited with the successful launch of her career; Lavigne performed on a host of radio-sponsored multi-artist holiday shows throughout the United States, a marketing strategy that induced higher sales of the album during the season. She embarked on her first headlining tour, Try to Shut Me Up Tour, which took place on 23 January 2003, and ended on 4 June 2003. Lavigne toured with her band—drummer Matthew Brann, bassist Mark Spicoluk, and guitarists Jesse Colburn and Evan Taubenfeld—which she had grouped after signing the deal. In the tour, she included all songs off Let Go, B-sides, and cover versions of "Knockin' on Heaven's Door" by Bob Dylan and "Basket Case" by Green Day.

Lavigne filmed her performance in Buffalo, New York, on 18 May 2003, the final date of her five-week headlining North American tour. The tour DVD My World was released on 4 November 2003, on joint venture by Arista Records and 20th Century Fox Home Entertainment. The DVD features the concert, a behind-the-scenes featurette, five music videos and a six-song bonus audio CD that includes an unreleased track "Why".

Singles
"Complicated" was released by Arista as the album's lead single, which was seen as an across-all-age-groups introduction to Lavigne. Thought to produce wide cross-demographic appeal, however, the music video for the single features Lavigne and her band wreaking havoc in a mall, "the sort of imagery that might have grown-ups thinking 'Clean that mess up!' more than clamoring for the record." The song topped the charts in several countries and was nominated for two Grammy Awards for Song of the Year and Best Female Pop Vocal Performance.

The second single, "Sk8er Boi", was aimed at pop-punk-oriented kids. The release of "Sk8er Boi" created disagreement among many radio programming directors. However, their impressions were diverted as listeners helped change their minds; early rotation of the single proved successful, showing it was as popular with post-collegiate listeners as with teens. The song reached number one on US mainstream radio.

"I'm with You" was released in late November 2002, close to Christmas holidays to remind parents about the album to, if not to buy it themselves, to purchase it for any children in their family. The song became another success for Lavigne reaching number four in the Billboard Hot 100, number one on mainstream radio and the top 10 in the UK and Canada. It was not officially released in Australia but received radio and television airplay. To date, Let Go is Lavigne's only album to produce multiple top-ten singles in the US. The song was also nominated for two Grammy Awards the same categories as "Complicated". The release arrangement of the album's singles, with "I'm with You" being served as the third, was regarded as "controversial", given that "I'm with You" was "thought by some to be the biggest potential smash on the album", and could have established Lavigne as a more mature artist if it was released first. According to Reid, "Some people just really didn't get that. And with the first video, there was some concern that maybe because it's so young and so playful, it might alienate more serious music lovers."

"Losing Grip" was released as the fourth single from the album, "to act as a bridge into her next album", which Lavigne stated would be "harder-rocking" than her debut. In 2004, it was nominated for the Grammy Award for Best Female Rock Vocal Performance.

"Mobile" was released in New Zealand in May 2003, as the fifth single. It was later used in 2003's The Medallion, the 2004 film Wimbledon, and a brief appearance in the film Just Married. In 2011, a music video for the song leaked onto the Internet made from official footage that was never finished. 

"Nobody's Fool" was released as the sixth and final single when it was sent to the radio in January 2005, almost two years after the previous single from Let Go, and after the release of Lavigne's second studio album, Under My Skin. However, it is possible and actually likely that this was a typo for Lavigne's single "Nobody's Home" from her second studio album. 

Other songs were released as regional radio-only singles. "Things I'll Never Say" was released as a radio-only single in Italy. "Unwanted" was released as a promotional single in the United Kingdom. The song "Tomorrow" was played in one episode of the second season of the television series Smallville and the first season of the television series The Last of Us, while the song "Anything but Ordinary" was played in the third episode of the first season of the television series Birds of Prey.

20th anniversary edition
A new edition of Let Go, newly remixed by John Feldmann, was released on June 3, 2022, to coincide with the 20th anniversary of the original album's release. The album contains the thirteen original tracks plus six bonus tracks.

A new recording of "Breakaway" is featured on the re-release. Lavigne originally wrote the song in 2001, then passed it to American singer Kelly Clarkson who recorded it for The Princess Diaries 2: Royal Engagement soundtrack. The original demo version by Lavigne had previously leaked online in 2014.

Critical reception

Let Go received mostly positive responses from critics, earning a metascore of 68 over 100 on Metacritic, which is based on the collated reviews from 9 publications. Rolling Stone magazine's music critic Pat Blashill wrote that the album "comes fully loaded with another dozen infectious hymns of Total Request angst". Blashill complimented Lavigne on having a "great voice", adding she crafted the album with "a qualified staff of hitmakers".  Christina Saraceno of AllMusic noted that Lavigne "handles a variety of styles deftly", while also complimenting her as "a capable songwriter with vocal chops". Nonetheless, Saraceno opined that "at her age, one imagines, she is still finding her feet, borrowing from the music she's grown up listening to". John Perry of Blender magazine summarized Let Go into an "outstanding guitar-pop debut". A review in Q magazine praised Lavigne for displaying "a musical guile way beyond her years". Kaj Roth of Melodic felt that Lavigne "sings lovely and some of the songs goes in the Alanis Morissette  vein". For Jon Caramanica of Entertainment Weekly magazine (who gave the album a B−), "Lavigne's monochromatic debut set of unimaginative guitar rock is saved only by the earnestness of her songs."

Some reviewers had similar sentiments toward the quality of the lyrics to some songs in the album. Saraceno said that Lavigne "still has some growing up to do lyrically", asserting "Sk8er Boi" shows her "lyrical shortcomings" and calling the phrasing in "Too Much to Ask" "awkward and sometimes silly". Perry noted the lyrics to "Sk8er Boi" as "endearingly naive".

Accolades
The album earned Lavigne numerous awards from organizations around the world. The success of the album's commercial performance led Lavigne to be named Best New Artist at the 2002 MTV Video Music Awards as well as winning a World Music Award for Best-Selling Canadian Singer. She won three awards—Favorite Female Artist, Favorite Breakthrough Artist, and the Style Award—the most of any performer at the 2003 MTV Asia Awards. She received five nominations for the album at the 2003 Grammy Awards, including Best New Artist and Best Pop Vocal Album. The album's singles "Complicated" and "I'm with You" were nominated Song of the Year at the 2003 and 2004 ceremony, respectively, accumulating eight nominations for the album. Lavigne was nominated for six categories at the 2003 Juno Awards—which were presented in Ottawa—winning four including Best Album and Best New Artist.

Commercial performance
Let Go was commercially successful in the United States, gaining praise from Entertainment Weekly magazine as one of the biggest pop debut albums of 2002. According to Billboard, as of 2022, Let Go is one of the 15 best-performing 21st-century albums without any of its singles being number-one hits on the Billboard Hot 100. The album debuted on the Billboard 200 at number eight on the strength of 62,000-unit sales and later peaked at number two. Its high debut was fueled by the success of "Complicated", which was in heavy rotation on MTV. Increasing weekly sales allowed the album to stay inside the chart's top 10 for 37 weeks. The album sold at least 100,000 copies every week straight until late 2002, easily accumulating over 2-million-unit sales. In a December 2002 report by Entertainment Weekly magazine, it was stated that the album had sold 3.9 million copies, becoming the third top-selling album of 2002 in the United States. Year-end figures released by Nielsen SoundScan revealed that Let Go had sold over 4.1 million copies in the United States, accumulated in 30 weeks of the album's release. Let Go was certified double platinum by the Recording Industry Association of America. This earned Let Go the distinction of being the highest-shipped debut of 2002 and best-selling album by a female artist. On 30 April 2003, the RIAA certified the album six-times platinum, denoting shipments of over six million units. It remains Lavigne's best-selling album to date, with 6.9 million copies sold in the United States and over 16 million worldwide.

Chartwise, the album reached higher peak positions notably during and after the holidays. Following her show-opening performance at the 2002 Billboard Music Awards, Let Go continued to be one of the holiday's top sellers with sales that week of 272,000. It reached its highest sales week on the issue dated 4 January 2003 with 363,000 copies sold. Although it had peaked at number two in September 2002, Let Go rose from three to two on the Billboard 200 on the issue dated 1 February 2003. The increase of sales was the offshoot to Lavigne's appearance on 11 January in Saturday Night Live as the show's musical guest. There were accusations of lip-synching but in an interview at the time she tells she has never lip-sung or ever plans to. During this time also, Lavigne received much media coverage due to her nominations at the 2003 Grammy Awards and for embarking on her first North American tour. In the United Kingdom, the album took longer to reach the summit of the UK Albums Chart. In its 18th week of release, reached on the chart year 2003, the album hit number one, rising to the top spot over the holiday, making Lavigne breaking a record becoming the youngest female singer to top the chart at 17 years and nine months old. However, the record was broken by Joss Stone in October 2004, when her album Mind Body & Soul debuted at number one on the UK Albums Chart when she was 17 years and five months old.

The album's international sales upsurge was attributed to the continuing success of "Sk8er Boi". Let Go is the 12th best-selling album of 2003 in the United Kingdom. The album has been certified six-times platinum by the British Phonographic Industry.

Let Go was also selling well in Canada, surpassing sales of over one-million-unit sales in less than a year. The Canadian Recording Industry Association certified the album diamond in May 2003. In Australia, Let Go had been certified seven-times platinum by the Australian Recording Industry Association in 2003, based on the sales of over 490,000 units from wholesalers to retailers. The album is the tenth best-selling album of 2002 there, and the third in the following year. Overall, the album charted at number one in six countries and top five in eight countries.

Impact and legacy
The album is considered one of the albums that transformed the pop punk music scene, helping to consolidate the genre in the mainstream and contributing to the rise of female-fronted pop punk bands and female-driven punk-influenced pop music.

Track listing

Personnel
Credits adapted from the liner notes of Let Go.

Musicians
Avril Lavigne – lead vocals, background vocals (11), guitar (11)
The Matrix – additional vocals (2–4, 8–9)
Clif Magness – bass (1, 5–6, 10, 12–13), guitar (1, 5–6, 10, 12), keyboards (1, 5–6, 10, 12–13)
Suzie Katayama – Cello (4)
Jeff Allen – bass (11)
Joe Bonadio – drums (11)
Josh Freese – drums (1, 5–6, 10, 12)
Alex Elena – drums (7, 13)
Victor Indruizzo – (3)
Gerry Leonard – guitar (11)
Corky James – guitar (2–4, 8–9)
Peter Zizzo – guitar (11)
Curt Frasca – multi instruments (7), guitar (3)
Dennis Johnson – beats & scratching (11)

Production
The Matrix – producer (2–4, 8–9), arranger (2–4, 8–9)
Clif Magness – producer (1, 5–6, 10, 12–13), programming (1, 5–6, 10), drum looping (13), sequencing (13)
Curt Frasca – producer (7, 12–13), programming (13)
Antonio "LA" Reid – executive producer
Rick Kerr – engineer
Leon Zervos – mastering
Curt Frasca – producer (7, 12), programming (7)
Peter Zizzo – producer (11), arranger (11), Pro-Tools editing (11), programming (11)
Jen Scaturro – Pro-Tools editing (11), programming (11)
Avril Lavigne – art direction
Tom Lord-Alge – mixing (1–9, 11)
Randy Staub – mixing (10)
David Leonard – mixing (12–13)
Sabelle Breer – vocal arranger (7, 13), additional vocal production (7, 13)

Charts

Weekly charts

Year-end charts

Decade-end charts

All-time charts

Certifications

Notes

References

External links 
 

2002 debut albums
Arista Records albums
Avril Lavigne albums
Nettwerk Records albums
Juno Award for Album of the Year albums
Juno Award for Pop Album of the Year albums